Susan Zarate is an American costume illustrator for the film and music industry known for her work on the films To Wong Foo, Thanks for Everything! Julie Newmar, Batman & Robin, Amistad, A.I. Artificial Intelligence, Anchorman: The Legend of Ron Burgundy, and X-Men: The Last Stand; the television series 24, under costume designer Jim Lapidus; and with costume designer Erin Lareau on Katy Perry's California Dreams Tour. She has worked with lead costume designers Milena Canonero, Ruth E. Carter, Michael Christiansen, Ingrid Ferrin, Shelley Komarov, Christopher Lawrence, Judianna Makovsky, Debra McGuire, Ha Nguyen, Bob Ringwood, Marlene Stewart, and Robert Turturice.

Zarate taught on the faculty of Otis College of Art and Design in Los Angeles, California.

Her sketch of a design for Julianna Margulies in The Newton Boys is included in the Costume Designers Guild collection of the Academy of Motion Picture Arts and Sciences.

Filmography
2009 Hannah Montana: The Movie
2008 Tropic Thunder
2006 X-Men: The Last Stand
2005 Sky High
2005 Monster-in-Law
2004 Anchorman: The Legend of Ron Burgundy
2004 Spider-Man 2
2002 Solaris
2001 A.I. Artificial Intelligence
2000 The Flintstones in Viva Rock Vegas
1997 Amistad
1997 Batman & Robin
1995 To Wong Foo Thanks for Everything, Julie Newmar

References 

American women illustrators
American illustrators
Otis College of Art and Design faculty
Living people
Year of birth missing (living people)
American women academics
21st-century American women